Ab Barik or Ab-e Barik or Ab-i-Barik may refer to:

Afghanistan
 Āb Bārīk, a village in Afghanistan 
 Ab-e Barik-e Qowdi, a village in Afghanistan

Iran

Fars Province
Ab Barik, Fars, a village in Eqlid County

Hamadan Province
Ab Barik, Bahar, a village in Bahar County
Ab Barik, Razan, a village in Razan County

Kerman Province
Ab Barik, Kerman, a village in Manujan County

Kermanshah Province
Ab Barik, Kangavar, a village in Kangavar County
Ab Barik-e Jonubi, a village in Sahneh County
Ab Barik-e Shomali, a village in Sahneh County
Ab Barik, Sarpol-e Zahab, a village in Sarpol-e Zahab County
Ab Barik-e Olya, Kermanshah, a village in Sonqor County
Ab Barik-e Sofla, Kermanshah, a village in Sonqor County
Ab Barik-e Vosta, a village in Sonqor County
Ab Barik Rural District, in Sonqor County

Khuzestan Province
Ab Barik, Khuzestan, a village in Masjed Soleyman County

Kurdistan Province
 Ab Barik, Bijar, a village in Bijar County
 Ab Barik, Dehgolan, a village in Dehgolan County
 Ab Barik, Divandarreh, a village in Divandarreh County
 Ab Barik, Qorveh, a village in Qorveh County

Lorestan Province
 Ab Barik, Aligudarz, a village in Aligudarz County
 Ab Barik-e Olya, Aligudarz, a village in Aligudarz County
 Ab Barik-e Sofla, Aligudarz, a village in Aligudarz County
 Ab Barik, Kuhdasht, a village in Kuhdasht County
 Ab Barik-e Olya, Selseleh, a village in Selseleh County
 Ab Barik-e Sofla, Selseleh, a village in Selseleh County

Markazi Province
Ab Barik, Markazi, a village in Shazand County

North Khorasan Province
 Ab Barik, North Khorasan, a village in Jajrom County

Qazvin Province
 Ab Barik, Qazvin, a village in Buin Zahra County

Razavi Khorasan Province
 Ab Barik-e Bala, a village in Bajestan County
 Ab Barik, Razavi Khorasan, a village in Sabzevar County
 Ab Barik-e Olya, Razavi Khorasan, a village in Torbat-e Heydarieh County
 Ab Barik-e Sofla, Razavi Khorasan, a village in Torbat-e Heydarieh County

Tehran Province
 Ab Barik, Tehran, a village in Varamin County
 Ab Barik-e Kuchek, a village in Firuzkuh County

See also
 Barik Ab (disambiguation)